The European Jewish Parliament or EJP (formerly known as European Jewish Union or EJU) is a non-governmental organization (NGO) based in Brussels whose stated aim is to be "a uniting structure for all Jewish communities and organizations throughout Western, Eastern and Central Europe as well as establish a permanent relationship with the European Parliament as well as national parliaments."

The EJU-backed EJP is the brainchild of Ukrainian billionaire Vadim Rabinovich.

European Jewish Union
The EJU group was founded in the Spring of 2011 by Ihor Kolomoyskyi, Vadim Rabinovich and Alexander Zanzer

The EJU hoped to establish a European Jewish Parliament, comprising 120 members modeled on the Israeli Knesset.  This group would then represent the concerns of the Jewish community to the European Union.

The European Jewish Parliament was inaugurated on February, 16th 2012.

The first EJP annual general assembly was held in Brussels on May 15 and 16 2012.

EJP logo

The European Jewish Parliament logo is modeled on the flag of Europe's crown of 12 golden stars with 5 rays on a blue background.

Instead the EJP logo uses a crown of 11 golden stars with a 12th star being a white Star of David, stylized as on the flag of Israel, on a blue background.

See also 
 European Parliament

References

External links 
 

International Jewish organizations
Political organizations based in Europe
Jewish organizations based in Europe
Jewish political organizations
Political advocacy groups in Europe
Organizations related to the European Union
Jewish organizations established in the 2010s